The 88th Division was a German-trained and reorganized division in the National Revolutionary Army.

First Battle of Shanghai
The division was present at the First Battle of Shanghai in 1932 under the command of General Yu Jishi as part of the Fifth Army, fighting alongside the 19th Route Army.

Order of Battle (1932)
5th Army - Zhang Zhizhong (張治中)
88th Division - General Yu Jishi (余濟時) 
262nd Brigade - Qin Lungti (錢倫體)
264th Brigade - Yang Bufei (楊步飛)

The 88th Division as a German-trained division
In 1927 after the dissolution of the First United Front between the Nationalists and the Communists, the ruling Kuomintang (KMT) purged its leftist members and completely eliminated Soviet influence from its ranks. Chiang Kai-shek turned to Germany, historically a great military power, for assistance in the  reorganization of the National Revolutionary Army.

The Weimar Republic sent advisors to China, however due to restrictions imposed by the Treaty of Versailles, these advisors could not serve in military capacities. When Adolf Hitler became Chancellor in 1933 and disregarded the Treaty, the National Socialist Party and the KMT united by their shared anti-communist ideals began closely cooperating with Germany training Chinese troops and expanding Chinese infrastructure while China made its markets and natural resources available to Germany.

In 1934 General Hans von Seeckt, acting as advisor to Chiang, proposed a '60 Division Plan' for restructuring the Chinese Nationalist Army into 60 divisions of highly trained, well-equipped troops along German doctrines. The 88th Division was one of the first divisions to be reorganized and alongside the 36th Division and 87th Division became the cream of the crop of the National Revolutionary Army.

The Battle of Shanghai

In 1937, though still not completely trained and fully equipped with German weapons, the 88th Division under the command of Sun Yuanliang was rushed to the Second Battle of Shanghai alongside the other German-trained divisions. The elite, German-trained division performed admirably, pushing the Japanese marines back to the very shores of Shanghai. While the Chinese Air Force provided much air-interdiction and close-air support early-on in the battle of Shanghai, pressing demands for air force units in the northern front at the Battle of Taiyuan and southern front at Guangzhou, plus heavy attrition in the Shanghai-Nanjing theater of operations eventually overwhelmed the Chinese Air Force units, the eventual absence of air and naval support, poor coordination between units, and the lack of defence in depth, resulted in the division suffering heavy casualties towards the end of the three-month battle. On 25 November 1937, Generalissimo Chiang Kai-shek ordered the division withdrawn to join the ill-fated Battle of Nanjing. This led to portions of the 524th Regiment remaining at the Sihang Warehouse for several days, where they successfully covered the retreat of the division while beating back numerous Japanese assaults on the warehouse.

After the Battle of Nanking, the 88th Division never recovered its former strength and was of limited significance later in the war. In 1938 the 88th Division participated in the Battle of Wuhan as part of the 71st Army. In 1942 the 88th Division was again reorganized and redeployed into Burma as part of the Chinese Expeditionary Force (in Burma).

Order of Battle (1937)
88th Division - Total strength: 14,000 men
2 infantry brigades
1 artillery company
1 light artillery company
1 signal company
1 SpcOps company
3 infantry battalions
3 infantry companies
3 infantry platoons
3 infantry squads
1 heavy weapons company
directly under divisional command
1 artillery battalion
3 artillery companies
1 anti-tank company
1 anti-air company
1 engineer company
1 signal company
2 "wired" platoons
1 wireless platoon
1 heavy transport company
1 SpcOps company
1 field hospital team
2 reserve regiments

See also
 Arthur Chin
 Republic of China Air Force
Gen Yu Jishi's publications

References

Divisions of the National Revolutionary Army
C